Chlorine and oxygen can bond in many ways:

chlorine monoxide, chlorine (II) oxide
 chlorine peroxide, dimer of chlorine (II) oxide
chlorine dioxide, chlorine (IV) oxide
chloroperoxyl, 
chlorine trioxide, ClO3, chlorine (VI) oxide
dichlorine monoxide, Cl2O, chlorine (I) oxide
Three dichlorine dioxides:
ClO dimer, Cl2O2, chlorine (I) peroxide
chloryl chloride, ClO2Cl, chlorine (0,IV) oxide
chlorine chlorite, ClOClO, chlorine (I,III) oxide
dichlorine trioxide, Cl2O3, chlorine (III) oxide, is hypothetical
dichlorine trioxide, Cl2O3, chlorine (I,V) oxide (second isomer)
dichlorine tetroxide, also known as chlorine perchlorate, ClOClO3, chlorine (I,VII) oxide
dichlorine pentoxide, Cl2O5, is hypothetical
dichlorine heptoxide, Cl2O7, chlorine (VII) oxide
chlorine tetroxide, 
chlorine (VII) oxide peroxide, (OClO3)2

Several ions are also chlorine oxides:
chloryl, 
perchloryl, 
hypochlorite, ClO−
chlorite, ClO2−
chlorate, ClO3−
perchlorate, ClO4−

See also
Oxygen fluoride
Bromine oxide
Iodine oxide
Sulfur fluorides, some of which are valence isoelectronic with chlorine oxides.

References
Chlorine oxoacids and structure of dichlorine oxides. Chem. Educator, Vol. 16, 2011, vol. 16, pp. 275—278

Chlorine oxides